The Homestead, 25 Woodbourne Road, Edgbaston, Birmingham, England is a house built in 1897. It was designed by Charles Bateman, and built by James Smith & Son. The architectural style is Arts and Crafts and the house is a Grade I listed building. The garden wall and gate piers facing Woodbourne Road have a separate Grade I listing. The Homestead remains a private residence.

History
Over a period of some three hundred years, the city of Birmingham expanded from a West Midlands town with few natural advantages into England's second city and "one of the greatest manufacturing centres in the world". The later 19th century saw major growth of the city's suburbs, including that of Edgbaston, to the south-west of the city centre. The area largely belonged to the Gough-Calthorpe family which presided over sensitive development aimed at the city's affluent middle and upper classes. The city's architects developed a distinctive regional variant of the Arts and Crafts architectural style, inspired by William Lethaby's The Hurst at Four Oaks, Sutton Coldfield, and culminating in the Bournville model village developed by the Cadbury family of chocolate manufacturers.

Charles Bateman (1863–1947) was firmly in this architectural tradition. Working with his father John Jones Bateman, and over the course of a career spent largely in Birmingham and the Cotswolds, he developed a substantial practice. Bateman undertook considerable work in the industrial and commercial, as well as the domestic, fields. Peter Davey considers his printing works, on Cornwall Street in Birmingham, to be “one of the most daring designs for an industrial building of the period.”  In 1897, he began the construction of The Homestead. The house remains a private residence.

Architecture and description
The Arts and Crafts architectural style in domestic architecture was championed by Edwin Lutyens and popularised by his friend, collaborator and client, Edward Hudson, the owner of Country Life. The style caught hold in the English suburbs; Peter Davey, in his study Arts and Crafts Architecture, notes that "the architecture of Voysey, Baillie Scott, Parker and early Lutyens lives on in endless copies of hips and gables, half-timbering and harling, mullions and leaded bay windows". The Homestead is built to an L-plan and is of two storeys and three bays. The interior remains “virtually as built”. Julian Holder notes the “Voysey-like assurance” of Bateman's composition. The house's Historic England listing record calls it “the most innovating of Bateman and Bateman’s domestic Arts and Crafts designs”.

In his 2007 Birmingham volume of the Pevsner Architectural Guides, Andy Foster references The Homestead but does not describe it. Foster's new guide, Birmingham and the Black Country, published in 2022 has detailed coverage of the house. Describing it as one of Bateman's "most important houses, and perhaps his most progressive", Foster notes the uncommon, double-pile, design and the many, more traditional, features including a billiard room, inglenook fireplaces and the almost obligatory, inscribed homilies, in this case, East, West, Home's Best.

The Homestead is a Grade I listed building. The garden wall and the gate piers facing Woodbourne Road also have a Grade I listing.

Notes

References

Sources
 
 
 
 
 
 
 
 
 

Edgbaston, Yateley Road, 21
Grade I listed houses
Houses completed in 1897
Arts and Crafts architecture in England
Edgbaston
Architects from Birmingham, West Midlands